Arthrostylidium  punctulatum is a species of Arthrostylidium bamboo in the grass family.

Distribution 
Arthrostylidium punctulatum is endemic to Colombia.

Description 
Arthrostylidium punctulatum grows up to a height of 400–700 mm.

References 

punctulatum